Lady Margaret Brodie Stewart became Margaret Herschel (1810–1864) was a British botanical artist and hostess. While she was in South Africa she and her husband made dozens of botanical paintings of wild flowers which they brought back to Europe for study. Her husband was one of the leading scientists in Victorian Britain.

Life
Lady Margaret Brodie Stewart was born in 1810. Her father was Alexander Stewart DD, a Scottish Presbyterian minister and Gaelic scholar.

She married her cousin John Herschel on 3 March 1829 in Edinburgh.

Visit to South Africa 

Her husband had his own inherited money and he paid £500 for passage on the S.S. Mountstuart Elphinstone. She and her husband and their three children and her husband's 20 inch telescope departed from Portsmouth on 13 November 1833.

The voyage to South Africa was made so that her husband could catalogue the stars, nebulae, and other objects of the southern skies. They arrived in Cape Town on 15 January 1834 and set up a private  telescope at Feldhausen at Claremont, a suburb of Cape Town.  Her husband collaborated with Thomas Maclear, the Astronomer Royal at the Cape of Good Hope and the two families became close friends. 

Herschel and her husband between 1834 and 1838 produced 131 botanical illustrations showing Cape flora. They used a camera lucida to obtained outlines of the specimens and Margaret dealt particularly with the details. Their portfolio had been intended as a personal record, and despite the lack of floral dissections in the paintings, their accuracy made them valuable. They were later published.

As their home during their stay in the Cape, the Herschels had selected 'Feldhausen' ("Field Houses"), an old estate on the south-eastern side of Table Mountain.

When HMS Beagle called at Cape Town, Captain Robert FitzRoy and the young naturalist Charles Darwin visited Herschel on 3 June 1836. Later on, Darwin would be influenced by Herschel's writings in developing his theory advanced in The Origin of Species.

They returned to England in 1838, where her husband became a baronet, of Slough in the County of Buckingham and she became Lady Margaret Herschel.

Death and legacy
She died in 1864 and some of her letters are in Trinity College and others are the British Library.

112 of the 132 known flower studies by Margaret and her husband were collected and published as Flora Herscheliana in 1996. The book also included work by Charles Davidson Bell and Thomas Bowler.

Private life
She had married her cousin John Herschel on 3 March 1829 in Edinburgh, and they had the following children:

 Caroline Emilia Mary Herschel (31 March 1830 – 29 January 1909), who married the soldier and politician Alexander Hamilton-Gordon
 Isabella Herschel (5 June 1831 – 1893)
 Sir William James Herschel, 2nd Bt. (9 January 1833 – 1917),
 Margaret Louisa Herschel (1834–1861), an accomplished artist
 Prof. Alexander Stewart Herschel (1836–1907), FRS, FRAS
 Col. John Herschel FRS, FRAS, (1837–1921) surveyor
 Maria Sophia Herschel (1839–1929) married Henry Hardcastle
 Amelia Herschel (1841–1926) married Sir Thomas Francis Wade, diplomat and sinologist
 Julia Herschel (1842–1933) married on 4 June 1878 to Captain (later Admiral) John Fiot Lee Pearse Maclear
 Matilda Rose Herschel (1844–1914), a gifted artist, married William Waterfield (Indian Civil Service)
 Francisca Herschel (1846–1932)
 Constance Anne Herschel (1855–20 June 1939)

References

1810 births
1864 deaths
British painters
People from Edinburgh